Silene alexandri is a rare species of flowering plant in the family Caryophyllaceae known by the common names Kamalo Gulch catchfly and Alexander's catchfly. It is endemic to Hawaii, where it is known only from the island of Molokai. It is threatened by the degradation of its habitat and it is a federally listed endangered species of the United States.

This subshrub grows 30 to 60 centimeters tall and bears white flowers. It grows in moist lowland shrubland on the sides of steep basalt cliffs. The plant has only been seen on a four-kilometer-long stretch of the island of Molokai. Today only one small population of six plants is thought to remain.

This plant is threatened by invasive species of introduced plants in its habitat, including lantana (Lantana camara), molasses grass (Melinis minutiflora), and Natal grass (Rhyncelytrum repens). The habitat is degraded by feral goats. Also, the species faces the loss of reproductive vigor because so few individuals remain in the breeding pool.

References

alexandri
Endemic flora of Hawaii
Biota of Molokai